Dipankar Banerjee is an Indian solar physicist. He is Professor of Solar Physics at the Indian Institute of Astrophysics (Bangalore) and currently serves as the director of the Aryabhatta Research Institute of Observational Sciences (AIRES).

Education and early career 
In 1987, Banerjee completed a Bachelor's Degree at St. Xaviers College, Calcutta in Physics (major), Chemistry and Mathematics. In 1996 he completed his PhD "Magnetohydrodynamic phenomena in the solar atmosphere" at the Indian Institute of Astrophysics (Bangalore) with Prof. S.S. Hasan. Via a PPARC fellowship, he worked as a postdoctoral fellow at Armagh Observatory between 1997 and 2000 on solar atmospheric dynamics using the SOHO spacecraft. This was followed by a Fund for Scientific Research (Flanders) fellowship at the Katholic University of Leuven between 2000 and 2002. In 2004, he returned to the Indian Institute of Astrophysics (Bangalore) and was promoted to Professor in 2016.

Research interests 
Banerjee's primary research interest is the dynamics of the solar atmosphere. In particular, he has focussed on the propagation of wavs through the solar chromosphere and corona, including innovations in the technique of atmospheric magnetoseismology. He has also studied space weather and the solar dynamo through long-term observations such as those provided by the 100-year synoptic data from Kodaikanal Observatory.

Awards and honours 
 1997: PPARC postdoctoral fellowship
 2002: Fund for Scientific Research (Flanders) fellowship
 2013: Visiting professor (Capita Selecta Lecturer) at Centre for Plasma Astrophysics, K.U. Leuven
 2015: Associate Editor for Solar Physics
 2016: Co-I of Polarimeter on the PUNCH spacecraft
 2017: PI of the Kodaikanal Solar Observatory data archive
 2017: Co-I for near-UV imaging instrument (SUIT) on the Aditya-L1 mission
 2017: Co-chair of the science working group for the Aditya-1 mission
 2020: Editor for Frontiers Stellar and Solar Physics

References 

21st-century Indian physicists
Living people
St. Xavier's College, Kolkata alumni
Indian Institute of Astrophysics
Year of birth missing (living people)